Cochin Shadhi at Chennai 03 is a 2020 Indian Malayalam-language film directed by Manjith Divakar. The film stars R. K. Suresh, Akshatha Sreedhar Shastry, Neha Saxena, and Vinoth Kishan as leading cast members. The film follows main character Shadika on her journey to Chennai where she encounters trouble along the way. The film was simultaneously shot in Tamil as Vanmurai (Violence).

Cast 
 R. K. Suresh as ACP Ameer Yousaf
 Neha Saxena as Zareena Thomas
 Charmila as Lakshmi
 Vinoth Kishan as Auto Renjan
Shivaji Guruvayoor as Bus Driver
Akshita Sridhar as Shadika
 Vigil Varghese

Production 
The film is based on a real-life incident that happened in Coimbatore: a teenage girl boards the wrong bus, initiating a series of interesting events. Filming was originally planned to be only shot in Malayalam, but was also shot in Tamil.

Release 
Regarding the Malayalam version, The Times of India gave the film a rating of one-and-a-half out of five stars and stated that "Cochin Shadhi At Chennai 03 is a cringe-fest you can avoid without a second thought. It has nothing new to offer, making it stale wine in an old bottle". Regarding the Tamil version, Maalaimalar praised the story, music, and cinematography while criticizing the screenplay.

References

External links 

2020s Tamil-language films
2020s Malayalam-language films